The 1985–86 All-Ireland Senior Club Hurling Championship was the 49th staging of the All-Ireland Senior Club Hurling Championship, the Gaelic Athletic Association's premier inter-county club hurling tournament. The championship began on 25 August 1985 and ended on 16 March 1986.

St. Martin's were the defending champions, however, they failed to qualify after being defeated by Glenmore in the semi-final of the Kilkenny Championship.

On 16 March 1986, Kilruane MacDonaghs won the championship after a 1-15 to 2-10 defeat of Buffers Alley in the final at Croke Park. It remains their only All-Ireland triumph.

Results

Connacht Senior Club Hurling Championship

First round

Second round

Semi-final

Final

Leinster Senior Club Hurling Championship

Preliminary round

First round

Quarter-finals

Semi-finals

Final

Munster Senior Club Hurling Championship

Quarter-finals

Semi-finals

Finals

Ulster Senior Club Hurling Championship

First round

Second round

Semi-finals

Final

All-Ireland Senior Club Hurling Championship

Quarter-final

Semi-finals

Final

Championship statistics

Miscellaneous

 The Ulster Championship first round game between Eire Óg Carrickmore and Clontibret O'Neills was abandoned by the referee with nine minutes remaining due to fading light.

References

1985 in hurling
1986 in hurling
All-Ireland Senior Club Hurling Championship